The U.S. state of Utah, the  Utah Department of Transportation (UDOT) operates a system of state routes that serve all portions of the state. In official documents the state of Utah uses the term "state routes" for numbered, state maintained highways, since the legal definition of a "highway" includes any public road. UDOT signs state routes with a beehive symbol after the state's nickname of the beehive state.

The numbers and routes of all Utah highways are assigned by the state legislature, currently documented in Utah Code Title 72, Chapter 4. The code also defines the Utah maintained portions of Interstate and U.S. Highways. With the exception of state route numbers assigned to match U.S. Highways and Interstate Highways, Utah state route numbers are not designated per any consistent pattern, though there are a few regional clusters of sequentially numbered highways.

There have been multiple changes to the numbering of state routes. Since 1969, the block of numbers between 281 and 320 is reserved for routes serving state institutions and state parks. With a few exceptions, these routes do not have their numbers publicly posted. Since 1977, the legislative designations do not have any concurrencies. For the situations where two numbered roads share the same physical roadbed, one of the designations will have a discontinuity in the legislative designation. For example, Interstate 84 is defined as a highway with two separate segments in Utah code, the part where I-84 is signed concurrent with Interstate 15 is only legally designated I-15.

Two Utah state Routes are special cases. State Route 900 and 901 are actually federal and county-maintained dirt roads that were assigned state numbers as to give the state power to block the transportation of nuclear waste to a proposed dump on Goshute tribal lands.

The shortest state route is State Route 231, a  connector route in Fairview, though this route is unsigned.

List

See also

Utah Scenic Byways
1962 Utah state route renumbering

Notes

References

External links

  UDOT Data Analytics division
 Utah Highways Page by Dan Stober (wayback archive)
 Utah Gateway @ AARoads

 
State highways